Udpura is a census town in Kota District in the Indian state of Rajasthan.

Geography
It has an average elevation of 325 metres (1066 feet).

Demographics
 India census, Udpura had a population of 8768. Males constitute 54% of the population and females 46%. Udpura has an average literacy rate of 67%, higher than the national average of 59.5%: male literacy is 76%, and female literacy is 57%. In Udpura, 17% of the population is under 6 years of age.

References

Cities and towns in Kota district